Russula olivacea is an edible and non-poisonous Russula mushroom found mostly in groups from June in deciduous and coniferous forests, mainly under spruce and beech; not rare.

Description 
The gills are cream, deep ochre when old and rather crowded and brittle. The spores are yellow.
The flesh is firm, white, with a pleasant or innocuous scent, and has a mild or nutty taste. Some say it is edible and other say it is toxic, perhaps causing gastrointestinal upset.

Similar species
Russula viscida is in size and habitat very similar; the surface of its cap is bright purple to blood red and shiny. The base turns leather yellow when old. Its flesh is quite pungent.

See also
List of Russula species

References

E. Garnweidner. Mushrooms and Toadstools of Britain and Europe. Collins. 1994.

External links

olivacea
Edible fungi
Fungi of Europe
Taxa named by Jacob Christian Schäffer